Vasily Alekseyevich Valkov (1904 – 1972) was a Soviet diplomat and political analyst.

Valkov held the following positions:

 1942–1945 – Advisor at the Soviet Embassy in London
 1945–1949 – Ambassador of the Soviet Union to the Netherlands
 1949–1951 – Deputy head of the Balkan Department at the Ministry of Foreign Affairs
 1951–1953 – Head of the Balkan Department at the Ministry of Foreign Affairs.
 1953–1955 – Ambassador of the Soviet Union to Yugoslavia
 1955–1956 – Official of the Ministry of Foreign Affairs
 1956–1972 – Official at the Institute of World Economy and International Relations

In the 1960s he published three books on international politics:

References

1904 births
1972 deaths
Recipients of the Order of the Red Banner of Labour
Recipients of the Order of the Red Star
Ambassadors of the Soviet Union to the Netherlands
Ambassadors of the Soviet Union to Yugoslavia